is a Japanese former volleyball player who competed in the 1984 Summer Olympics.

References

1959 births
Living people
Japanese men's volleyball players
Olympic volleyball players of Japan
Volleyball players at the 1984 Summer Olympics